Clitic climbing is a phenomenon first identified in Romance languages in which a pronominal object of an embedded infinitive appears attached to the matrix verb. Pronominal objects in Romance languages are typically expressed as clitics. The following Italian example illustrates the phenomenon. The object pronoun, lo, a clitic, is attached to the infinitive in the embedded or subordinate clause in (1a). In (1b), the clitic has "climbed" to the main or matrix clause and is attached to the matrix verb. There is no discernible difference in meaning between the two forms.

{|
| (1) || a. || Gianni || vuole || comprar=lo.
|-
|  ||  || Gianni || wants || to.buy=it
|-
|  ||  || colspan=3 | "Gianni wants to buy it."
|-
|  || b. || Gianni || lo=vuole || comprare.
|-
|  ||  || Gianni || it=wants || to.buy
|-
|  ||  || colspan=3 | "Gianni wants to buy it."
|}

Clitic climbing is found in almost all Romance languages. It is notably absent in French.

Other language families

Austronesian

Tagalog
Clitic climbing is also found in Tagalog.  As in the Italian example in (1) above, the embedded clause clitic, siya "her", in (2a) can optionally appear in the matrix clause as in (2b). 

{|
| (2) || a. || S‹in›ubuk.an || ni || Juan || =ng || dalaw.in=siya.
|- 
|  ||  || ‹›try. ||  || Juan ||  || visit.=
|-
|  ||  || colspan=5 | "Juan tried to visit her." 
|-
|  || b. || S‹in›ubuk.an=siya || ni || Juan || =ng || dalaw.in.
|- 
|  ||  || ‹›try.= ||  || Juan ||  || visit.
|-
|  ||  || colspan=5 | "Juan tried to visit her."
|}

Only clitics from embedded clauses in which the verb does not exhibit any aspectual morphology can climb to the matrix clause in Tagalog.

{|
| (3) || a. ||  || S‹in›abi.∅ || ni || Juan || na || d‹in›alaw.∅=siya || ni || Pedro.
|- 
|  ||  ||  || ‹›say. ||  || Juan ||  || ‹›visit.= ||  || Pedro
|-
|  ||  ||  || colspan=7 | "Juan said that Pedro visited her."
|-
|  ||  ||  || colspan=7 | (or "Juan said that she was visited by Pedro.") 
|-
|  || b. || * || S‹in›abi.∅=siya || ni || Juan || na || d‹in›alaw.∅ || ni || Pedro.
|- 
|  ||  ||  || ‹›say.= ||  || Juan ||  || ‹›visit. ||  || Pedro
|-
|  ||  ||  || colspan=7 | "Juan said that Pedro visited her."
|-
|  ||  ||  || colspan=7 | (or "Juan said that she was visited by Pedro.") 
|}

So, the sentence in (2b) is grammatical because the embedded verb, dalawin "to be visited", is not marked for any aspect, whereas the sentence in (3b) is ungrammatical because clitic climbing has occurred out of the embedded clause in which the verb, dinalaw "was visited", is marked for the perfective aspect.

References
Rizzi, Luigi. 1978. A Restructuring Rule in Italian Syntax. In Recent Transformational Studies in European Languages, ed. Samuel J. Keyser, 113-158. Cambridge, MA: MIT Press.

Romance languages
Syntax
Units of linguistic morphology